The Ambassador of Malaysia to the Republic of Croatia is the head of Malaysia's diplomatic mission to the Republic of Croatia. The position has the rank and status of an Ambassador Extraordinary and Plenipotentiary and is based in the Embassy of Malaysia, Zagreb.

List of heads of mission

Chargés d'Affaires to Croatia

Ambassadors to Croatia

See also
 Croatia–Malaysia relations

References 

 
Croatia
Malaysia